1. HFK Olomouc  is a football club in the Czech Republic, based in Olomouc. The club is currently playing in the Czech Fourth Division. The club previously played in the Czech 2. Liga from 2005–06 until relegation in the 2008–09 season. In 2012–13, HFK Olomouc finished third in the Second Division but were relegated due to financial difficulties.

Following a promotion to the 2. Liga for the 2000–01 season, the club changed its name from FK Holice 1932 to 1. HFK Olomouc.

1. HFK Olomouc advanced to the last 16 stage of the Czech Cup during the 2002–03, 2004–05, 2005–06 and 2010–11 seasons, but never made it into the quarter finals, losing on each occasion.

Historical names 
 1932 – FK Holice 1932
 1948 – Sokol Holice
 1950 – Závodní sokolská jednota Holice
 1953 – TJ Spartak Holice
 1968 – Sokol Holice
 1972 – TJ Olomouc-Holice
 1994 – FK Holice 1932 (merged with FC Lokomotiva Olomouc)
 2000 – 1. HFK Olomouc 1. HFK OLOMOUC, a. s. (První Holický Fotbalový Klub)

Players

Current squad

Notable former players

Managers
 Karel Trnečka (1999–2000)
 Milan Gajdůšek (2000)
 Petr Mrázek (2000)
 Josef Pučálka (2000)
 Alexander Bokij (2001)
 Roman Pivarník (2001)
 Karel Trnečka (2001)
 Roman Pivarník (2001–2002)
 Bohuš Keller (2002)
 Miloslav Machálek (2002–2003)
 Luděk Kokoška (2003–2004)
 Vítězslav Kolda (2004)
 Leoš Kalvoda (2004–2007)
 Tomáš Uličný (2008)
 Josef Mucha (2008–2009)
 Miroslav Kouřil (2009)
 Petr Uličný (2009–2011)
 Oldřich Machala (2011–2013)
 Jiří Derco (2013–)

History in domestic competitions

 Seasons spent at Level 1 of the football league system: 0
 Seasons spent at Level 2 of the football league system: 9
 Seasons spent at Level 3 of the football league system: 9
 Seasons spent at Level 4 of the football league system: 3

Czech Republic

Honours
Moravian–Silesian Football League (third tier)
 Champions (3): 1999–2000, 2004–05, 2011–12

References

External links
 Official website 

 
Olomouc, Hfk
Association football clubs established in 1932